Combinatorial physics or physical combinatorics is the area of interaction between physics and combinatorics.

Overview
"Combinatorial Physics is an emerging area which unites combinatorial and discrete mathematical techniques applied to theoretical physics, especially Quantum Theory."
"Physical combinatorics might be defined naively as combinatorics guided by ideas or insights from physics"

Combinatorics has always played an important role in quantum field theory and statistical physics. However, combinatorial physics only emerged as a specific field after a seminal work by Alain Connes and Dirk Kreimer, showing that the renormalization of Feynman diagrams can be described by a Hopf algebra.

Combinatorial physics can be characterized by the use of algebraic concepts to interpret and solve physical problems involving combinatorics. It gives rise to a particularly harmonious collaboration between mathematicians and physicists.

Among the significant physical results of combinatorial physics, we may mention the reinterpretation of renormalization as a Riemann–Hilbert problem, the fact that the Slavnov–Taylor identities of gauge theories generate a Hopf ideal, the quantization of fields and strings, and a completely algebraic description of the combinatorics of quantum field theory. The important example of editing combinatorics and physics is relation between enumeration of alternating sign matrix and ice-type model. Corresponding  ice-type model is six vertex model with domain wall boundary conditions.

See also
Mathematical physics
Statistical physics
Ising model
Percolation theory
Tutte polynomial
Partition function
Hopf algebra
Combinatorics and dynamical systems
Quantum mechanics

References

Further reading
Some Open Problems in Combinatorial Physics, G. Duchamp, H. Cheballah
One-parameter groups and combinatorial physics, G. Duchamp, K.A. Penson, A.I. Solomon, A.Horzela, P.Blasiak
Combinatorial Physics, Normal Order and Model Feynman Graphs, A.I. Solomon, P. Blasiak, G. Duchamp, A. Horzela, K.A. Penson
Hopf Algebras in General and in Combinatorial Physics: a practical introduction, G. Duchamp, P. Blasiak, A. Horzela, K.A. Penson, A.I. Solomon
Discrete and Combinatorial Physics
Bit-String Physics: a Novel "Theory of Everything", H. Pierre Noyes
Combinatorial Physics, Ted Bastin, Clive W. Kilmister, World Scientific, 1995, 
Physical Combinatorics and Quasiparticles, Giovanni Feverati, Paul A. Pearce, Nicholas S. Witte

Paths, Crystals and Fermionic Formulae, G.Hatayama, A.Kuniba, M.Okado, T.Takagi, Z.Tsuboi
On powers of Stirling matrices, István Mező
"On cluster expansions in graph theory and physics", N BIGGS — The Quarterly Journal of Mathematics, 1978 - Oxford Univ Press
Enumeration Of Rational Curves Via Torus Actions, Maxim Kontsevich, 1995
Non-commutative Calculus and Discrete Physics, Louis H. Kauffman, February 1, 2008
Sequential cavity method for computing free energy and surface pressure, David Gamarnik, Dmitriy Katz, July 9, 2008

Combinatorics and statistical physics
"Graph Theory and Statistical Physics", J.W. Essam, Discrete Mathematics, 1, 83-112 (1971).
Combinatorics In Statistical Physics
Hard Constraints and the Bethe Lattice: Adventures at the Interface of Combinatorics and Statistical Physics, Graham Brightwell, Peter Winkler
Graphs, Morphisms, and Statistical Physics: DIMACS Workshop Graphs, Morphisms and Statistical Physics, March 19-21, 2001, DIMACS Center, Jaroslav Nešetřil, Peter Winkler, AMS Bookstore, 2001,

Conference proceedings
Proc. of Combinatorics and Physics, Los Alamos, August 1998
Physics and Combinatorics 1999: Proceedings of the Nagoya 1999 International Workshop, Anatol N. Kirillov, Akihiro Tsuchiya, Hiroshi Umemura, World Scientific, 2001, 
Physics and combinatorics 2000: proceedings of the Nagoya 2000 International Workshop, Anatol N. Kirillov, Nadejda Liskova, World Scientific, 2001, 
Asymptotic combinatorics with applications to mathematical physics: a European mathematical summer school held at the Euler Institute, St. Petersburg, Russia, July 9-20, 2001, Anatoliĭ, Moiseevich Vershik, Springer, 2002, 
Counting Complexity: An International Workshop On Statistical Mechanics And Combinatorics, 10–15 July 2005, Dunk Island, Queensland, Australia
Proceedings of the Conference on Combinatorics and Physics, MPIM Bonn, March 19–23, 2007

Quantum mechanics